Vaghvadi (or (Vaghvori)) is a village and former non-salute princely state in Gujarat, western India. 

It lies in Sorath prant on Saurashtra peninsula.

History 
Vaghvadi was a petty princely state, comprising solely the village, ruled by Kathi Chieftains.

It had a population of 109 in 1901, yielding a state revenue of 1,450 Rupees (1903-4, nearly all from land) and a paying a tribute of 154 Rupees, to the Gaekwar Baroda State and Junagadh State.

External links and Sources 
History
 Imperial Gazetteer, on dsal.uchicago.edu - Kathiawar

Princely states of Gujarat